Hinckley-Finlayson Public Schools (ISD #2165) is a school district headquartered in Hinckley, Minnesota.

Within Pine County it serves Hinckley, Finlayson, and Brook Park. It also serves sections of Aitkin County and Kanabec County.

History
The district was established in 1994 through the consolidation of the Hinckley and Finlayson school districts. It was classified in Minnesota law as a cooperation and combination agreement.

 the district has about 1,000 students.

Facilities
By 1997 the district had a music room for the elementary school and an auditorium for events related to fine arts that was financed by a $4.3 million bond. There were three elections held, the first two being unsuccessful, but after the district promoted music as a method of learning for well into adulthood, the third election succeeded.

Schools
 Hinckley-Finlayson High School
 By 2012 a group of students formed "Friends of Rachel", inspired by Rachel's Challenge.
 Finlayson Elementary School
 Hinckley Elementary School

References

Further reading

External links
 Hinckley-Finlayson Public Schools
School districts in Minnesota
Education in Aitkin County, Minnesota
Kanabec County, Minnesota
Education in Pine County, Minnesota
1994 establishments in Minnesota
Educational institutions established in 1994